The 1968 Beltsville 300 was a NASCAR Grand National Series event that was held on May 17, 1968, at Beltsville Speedway in Beltsville, Maryland.

The transition to purpose-built racecars began in the early 1960s and occurred gradually over that decade.  Changes made to the sport by the late 1960s brought an end to the "strictly stock" vehicles of the 1950s.

Background
Beltsville Speedway was specially designed with banked turns for stock car racing. Originally known as the "Baltimore-Washington Speedway", this track received its final name in its 19th month of operation. The track hosted modified stock car racing vehicles alongside the other NASCAR series. Wednesday nights were the original night for racing but the schedule eventually added Friday night racing. Ten Grand National races were raced there including the popular Beltsville 300 series of races.

Race report
It took two hours for David Pearson (in his Holman-Moody owned '68 Ford Torino) to defeat Bobby Isaac (in his '67 Dodge Charger) by one lap and five seconds in front of 8,700 people. The majority of the starting grid would be driving Ford vehicles while Dodge, Chevrolet, Buick, Oldsmobile and Plymouth made up the minority of the racing vehicles. Notable crew chiefs who participated in the event were Ray Hicks, Jake Elder, Frankie Scott, Dale Inman and Harry Hyde.

The track was a paved oval track spanning . There was one Canadian participant named Frog Fagan; he started in 20th place and finished the race in 22nd place.

Total winnings for this race were $6,800 ($ when considering inflation); David Pearson would receive $1,400 ($ when considering inflation) while last-place finisher Wendell Scott would receive a meager $100 ($ when considering inflation). Tom Pistone was the start and park car for this race; he quit the race for reasons unknown. Other notable racers who participated included Wendell Scott, Buck Baker, and J.D. McDuffie.

Qualifying

Finishing order
Section reference:

 David Pearson (No. 17)
 Bobby Isaac (No. 71)
 Buddy Baker (No. 3)
 James Hylton (No. 48)
 John Sears (No. 4)
 Jabe Thomas (No. 25)
 Neil Castles (No. 06)
 Roy Tyner (No. 09)
 Bill Champion (No. 10)
 Henley Gray (No. 19)
 Earl Brooks (No. 28)
 Paul Dean Holt (No. 01)
 Elmo Langley (No. 64)
 Richard Petty (No. 43)
 J.D. McDuffie (No. 70)
 Tom Pistone (No. 55)
 George Davis (No. 07)
 Ed Negre (No. 8)
 Pete Hamilton (No. 5)
 Buck Baker (No. 88)
 Clyde Lynn (No. 20)
 Frog Fagan (No. 95)
 Wendell Scott (No. 34)

Timeline
Section reference:
 Start of race: Richard Petty starts the race with the pole position.
 Lap 3: Wendell Scott's bad oil pressure made him the last-place finisher.
 Lap 10: The head gasket on Frog Fagan's vehicle developed problems, forcing the Canadian to accept a 22nd-place finish.
 Lap 14: Clyde Lynn had a terminal crash; causing him to leave the race.
 Lap 82: Buck Baker's steering problem ended his day on the track.
 Lap 85: Pete Hamilton had a terminal crash, forcing him to leave the event.
 Lap 112: George Davis' rear end became a problem, forcing him to be pulled off for safety reasons.
 Lap 115: Tom Pistone left the race for reasons unknown.
 Lap 122: An oil leak ended J.D. McDuffie's hope of finishing the race.
 Lap 158: Richard Petty's engine acted up, ending his day on the track.
 Lap 159: David Pearson takes over the lead from Richard Petty.
 Lap 171: Elmo Langley's engine became faulty, bringing his day to an end.
 Lap 231: Bobby Isaac takes over the lead from David Pearson.
 Lap 243: David Pearson takes over the lead from Bobby Isaac.
 Lap 282: Jabe Thomas' engine problems forced him out of the race.
 Finish: David Pearson was officially declared the winner of the event.

References

NASCAR races at Beltsville Speedway
Beltsville 300
Beltsville 300
Beltsville 300